Cavalerius is a prominent lunar impact crater that lies on the western edge of the Oceanus Procellarum lunar mare on the west part of the visible Moon. It nearly joins the northern rim of Hevelius to the south.

The rim of Cavalerius is relatively high, rising to over 3 kilometers in places. There are clefts in the northern and southern parts of the rim and inner walls. Parts of the inner sides are terraced. The interior floor has mixed low hills and level areas. In the midpoint of the crater floor is a low central peak, with neighboring ridges to the north and east.

Northeast of this crater is the site designated Planitia Descensus, the landing site of the Soviet Luna 9 probe, the first vehicle to soft-land on the Moon. It lies among some low ridges along the edge of the Oceanus Procellarum.

Satellite craters
By convention these features are identified on lunar maps by placing the letter on the side of the crater midpoint that is closest to Cavalerius.

References

 
 
 
 
 
 
 
 
 
 
 
 

Impact craters on the Moon